Peter Edick Omondi Anyanga is a Kenyan politician. He belongs to the Orange Democratic Movement and was elected to represent the Nyatike Constituency in the National Assembly of Kenya since the 2007 Kenyan parliamentary election.  Members Of The 10th Parliament . Parliament of Kenya. Accessed June 19, 2008.</ref>

References

Living people
Year of birth missing (living people)
Orange Democratic Movement politicians
Members of the National Assembly (Kenya)